Globitermes is a genus of termites endemic to Southeast Asia and mostly inhabit the tropical rain-forests of this region. This genus contains three species which are known for their defensive strategy of autothysis.

Species
Globitermes brachycerastes Han, 1987 – China (Yunnan)
Globitermes globosus (Haviland, 1898) – Southeast Asia
Globitermes sulphureus (Haviland, 1898) – China (Yunnan), Southeast Asia

References

Termites
Termite genera
Insects of Asia